The 2022 KNSB Dutch Allround Championships in speed skating were held in Heerenveen at the Thialf ice skating rink from 22 to 23 January 2022. The tournament was part of the 2021–2022 speed skating season. Marcel Bosker and Merel Conijn won the allround titles.
The allround championships were held at the same time as the 2022 KNSB Sprint Allround Championships.

Schedule

Medalists

Men's allround

Women's allround

Source:

References

KNSB Dutch Allround Championships
KNSB Dutch Allround Championships
2022 Allround
KNSB